Kot morski (Polish for "Sea Cat") is a Polish coat of arms. It was used by several szlachta (noble) families under the Polish–Lithuanian Commonwealth.

History

Blazon

Notable bearers

See also
 Polish heraldry
 Heraldry
 Coat of arms

Kot morski